Ballyglunin railway station (Irish: Stáisiún traenach Bhéal Átha Glúinín) is a disused railway station close to the village of Ballyglunin in County Galway. Closed in 1976, the station building is a protected structure which is known for its association with the 1952 film, The Quiet Man.

History
The station is on the line from Limerick to Claremorris, and was originally opened in 1860 by the Waterford, Limerick and Western Railway. Operation was transferred to the Great Southern and Western Railway when it purchased the WLWR in 1901. 

The station was used during the filming of the film The Quiet Man starring John Wayne and Maureen O'Hara in 1952. As part of the rationalisation of the rail network by Córas Iompair Éireann (CIÉ) in the 1960s and 1970s, the station was closed along with the rest of the line for passenger services in 1976.

In the 2000s, a local community group, the Ballyglunin Railway Restoration Project, sought to restore the station buildings and site as a heritage tourism attraction. This project, which focused on the station's association with The Quiet Man, resulted in a number of restoration and conservation activities. In late 2019, the project received additional government funding to facilitate development "as a visitor attraction".

The station building is listed on Galway County Council's Record of Protected Structures.

Development proposals
The Irish Government's Transport 21 plan proposed that the Limerick-Claremorris line, with a stop at Ballyglunin, be re-opened as part of the Western Railway Corridor project. The first section of this line, between Limerick and Athenry stations, opened in 2010. Development of the second proposed section, between Athenry and Tuam via Ballyglunin, was not progressed.

References

Disused railway stations in County Galway
Railway stations opened in 1860
Railway stations closed in 1976